Neolentinus ponderosus, commonly known as the giant sawgill,  is a species of fungus in the family Gloeophyllaceae. Found in western North America, it was originally described in 1965 as a species of Lentinus by American mycologist Orson K. Miller.

Taxonomy
The fungus was first described as Lentinellus montanus by Orson K. Miller, based on collections that he had made in Idaho. In 1985 it was transferred to Neolentinus, a segregate genus created for Lentinus-type fungi that cause a brown rot in wood. The specific epithet ponderosa derives from the Latin word for "heavy".

Description

The caps have small cinnamon-brown scales (squamules) on the surface and a margin that is usually curved inward initially. The narrow gills have an adnate attachment to the stipe and are closely spaced, with intervening lamellulae (short gills) that extend about two-thirds of the distance to the stipe. The gill edges are serrated (notched like a saw), a feature that inspired the mushroom's common name. Gills are initially whitish before aging to light buff to light orange. Its reddish-brown surface is made of small scales that are less dense in the upper half, where it has a more whitish or buff color.

Fruit bodies produce a dull white to buff spore print. Microscopically, the spores are somewhat spindle-shaped when viewed from the side, and elliptical viewed from the front; they measure 8–10.5 by 3.5–4.4 μm and are inamyloid. The basidia (spore-bearing cells) are thin-walled and club-shaped, four-spored, and measure 26–36 by 5–8.8 μm. The cystidia on both the faces and edges of the gills are thin-walled, hyaline (translucent), narrowly club-shaped, and measure 26–36 by 5–8.8 μm. The cap cuticle comprises threadlike hyphae with a diameter of 4.4–8 μm, while the cap flesh is made of interwoven hyphae (both thick- and thin-walled) measuring 2.5–6 μm. Clamp connections are present in the hyphae.

The young mushrooms are edible, although they tend to become tough when mature. The flesh has a fruit or indistinct odor and a mild taste. They are prized by the Rarámuri Indians of Mexico.

Habitat and distribution
Neolentinus ponderosus is a saprophytic species, and grows on the stumps and logs of conifers, particularly ponderosa pine. It causes a brown rot in wood, whereby it breaks down the hemicellulose and cellulose to cause a brown discoloration, and the subsequent cracking of the wood into roughly cubical pieces. Fruit bodies grow singly or in small clusters, and usually prefer open spots with direct sunlight. The range of the fungus is restricted to the Pacific Northwest region of western North America. Fruiting occurs in late spring, or later (summer) in mountainous locales.

Similar species
The species resembles Neolentinus lepideus and Catathelasma imperiale.

References

Edible fungi
Fungi described in 1965
Fungi of North America
Gloeophyllales